Giovanni Francesco Venturini (1650–1710) was an Italian printmaker of the Baroque period.

He was born in Rome. From the style of his engraving, it is probable that he was a pupil of Giovanni Battista Galestruzzi. He etched several plates from the works of Italian masters, among them the following : 
A set of Plates; after Polidoro da Caravaggio.
Diana and her Nymphs; after Domenichino.
The Pulpit of S. Peter's; after Bernini.
A partial bird's-eye View of Rome.

References

External links
Metropolitan Museum of Art: Giovanni Francesco Venturini - works

1650 births
1710 deaths
Painters from Rome
Italian engravers
Italian Baroque painters